The Coptic Catholic Eparchy of Giza is an Eastern Catholic diocese in Giza. It is one of the suffragan sees comprising the sole ecclesiastical province (covering all Egypt) of the Coptic Catholic Patriarch of Alexandria, the head of the Coptic Catholic Church, a Particular church sui iuris (Alexandrian Rite).

Its episcopal see is Saint George cathedral in Giza, which is part of the national capital Cairo's metropolitan area.

Statistics 
As per 2014, it pastorally served 5,940 Coptic Catholics in 9 parishes with 13 priests (12 diocesan, 1 religious), 70 lay religious (22 brothers, 48 sisters) and 4 seminarians.

History 
Established on 2003.03.21 as Eparchy (Eastern Catholic Diocese) of Giza(–Fayoum–Beni Souef) /  (Latin adjective), on territory split off from the Coptic Catholic Patriarchate of Alexandria's proper diocese, as its suffragan.

Episcopal ordinaries
(all Coptic Alexandrian Rite)

Suffragan Eparchs (Bishops) of Giza (Guizeh)
 Andraos Salama (2003.03.21 – 2005.12.06), Titular Bishop of Barca (1988.11.01 – 2003.03.21) as Auxiliary Bishop of the Patriarchate Alexandria of the Copts (Egypt) (1988.11.01 – death 1997)
 Antonios Aziz Mina (2006.01.03 – retired 2017.01.23), previously Titular Bishop of Mareotes (2002.12.21 – 2006.01.03) as Bishop of Curia of the Copts ([2002.12.19] 2002.12.21 – 2006.01.03)
Apostolic Administrator Ibrahim Isaac Sedrak (2017.01.23 – ...), while Patriarch of Alexandria of the Copts (Egypt) ([2013.01.15] 2013.01.18 – ...), also President of Synod of the Catholic Coptic Church (2013.01.15 – ...) and President of Assembly of the Catholic Hierarchy of Egypt (2013.01.15 – ...); previously Eparch (Bishop) of Minya of the Copts (Egypt) ([2002.09.29] 2002.10.05 – 2013.01.15).

See also 
 List of Catholic dioceses in Egypt

References

Sources and external links 
 GCatholic Giza eparchy - data for all sections

Roman Catholic dioceses in Egypt
Eastern Catholic dioceses
Coptic Catholic Church